Maigonis Valdmanis (September 8, 1933 – October 30, 1999) was a Soviet and Latvian basketball player and coach. He was born in Riga.

He played for Rīgas ASK and won three Euroleague titles (1958, 1959, 1960) and four Soviet national league championships (1955, 1956, 1957, 1958).

Playing for the USSR national basketball team Maigonis Valdmanis won three gold medals at EuroBasket 1957, EuroBasket 1959, EuroBasket 1961, and silver medals at the 1952, 1956 and 1960 Olympic Games.

References

External links 
biography at Rīgas ASK homepage (Latvian)
basketpedya.com
rigasask.lv

1933 births
1999 deaths
Basketball players from Riga
Honoured Masters of Sport of the USSR
Merited Coaches of the Soviet Union
Recipients of the Order of the Red Banner of Labour
ASK Riga players
BK VEF Rīga players
Latvian men's basketball players
Soviet men's basketball players
1959 FIBA World Championship players
Olympic basketball players of the Soviet Union
Olympic silver medalists for the Soviet Union
Basketball players at the 1952 Summer Olympics
Basketball players at the 1956 Summer Olympics
Basketball players at the 1960 Summer Olympics
FIBA EuroBasket-winning players
Olympic medalists in basketball
Latvian basketball coaches
Latvian sports coaches
Medalists at the 1952 Summer Olympics
Medalists at the 1956 Summer Olympics
Medalists at the 1960 Summer Olympics